{{DISPLAYTITLE:Mu1 Scorpii}}

Mu1 Scorpii (μ1 Scorpii, abbreviated Mu1 Sco, μ1 Sco) is a binary star system in the southern zodiac constellation of Scorpius. The combined apparent visual magnitude of the pair is about magnitude 3, making it one of the brighter members of Scorpius. Based upon parallax measurements, the distance of this system from the Sun is roughly 500 light-years (150 parsecs). This system is a member of the Scorpius–Centaurus association, the nearest OB association of co-moving stars to the Sun.

The primary (Mu1 Scorpii Aa) is formally named Xamidimura , from the Khoekhoe xami di mûra  'the (two) eyes of the lion'.

Properties 

Mu1 Scorpii is an eclipsing binary of the Beta Lyrae type. Discovered to be a spectroscopic binary by Solon Irving Bailey in 1896, it was only the third such eclipsing pair to be discovered. This is a semidetached binary system where the secondary is close to filling its Roche lobe, or it may even be overflowing. The two stars revolve each other along a circular orbit with the components separated by 12.9 times the Sun's radius. Due to occultation of each component by the other, the apparent magnitude of the system decreased by 0.3 and 0.4 magnitudes over the course of the binary's orbit, which takes 34 hours 42.6 minutes to complete.

The primary component is a B-type main sequence star with a stellar classification of B1.5 V. It has 8.3 times the mass of the Sun and 3.9 times the Sun's radius. The secondary is a smaller B-type main sequence star with a classification of about B6.5 V, having 3.6 times the Sun's mass and 4.6 times the radius of the Sun. The effective temperature of the outer atmosphere for each star is 24,000 K for the primary and 17,000 K for the secondary. At these temperatures, the two stars glow with a blue-white hue.

Nomenclature 

μ1 Scorpii (Latinised to Mu1 Scorpii) is the system's Bayer designation. The designations of the primary as Mu1 Scorpii Aa derives from the convention used by the Washington Multiplicity Catalog (WMC) for multiple star systems, and adopted by the International Astronomical Union (IAU).

The pair of stars Mu1 and Mu2 Scorpii are known as the xami di mura 'eyes of the lion' by the Khoikhoi people of South Africa.

In 2016, the IAU organized a Working Group on Star Names (WGSN) to catalog and standardize proper names for stars. The WGSN decided to attribute proper names to individual stars rather than entire multiple systems. It approved the name Xamidimura for the component Mu1 Scorpii Aa on 5 September 2017 (along with Pipirima for the partner of Mu1 Scorpii) and it is now so included in the List of IAU-approved Star Names.

References

Scorpii, Mu1
Binary stars
Beta Lyrae variables
B-type main-sequence stars
Scorpius (constellation)
082514
Durchmusterung objects
151890
6247
Scorpius–Centaurus association